Band Toh Baje Ga (Previously titled: Go To Hell) is a Pakistani television film released on Eid-ul-Fitr 2018. The telefilm being made under Moomal Productions and stars Hania Amir and Yasir Hussain in lead.

Cast
Hania Amir
Yasir Hussain
Zainab Qayyum
Noman Masood
Nazli Nasr

Production
The Film was initially titled Go to Hell but the makers changed it to Band Toh Baje Ga. Film is directed by Misbah Khalid and produced by Moomal Productions, who previously produced successful drama serials  Zindagi Gulzar Hai, Shehr-e-Zaat and Ishq Junoon Deewangi. In the early May 2018, Amir posted her video of being part of the project. Talking about the project and his character, Yasir said, "Its a fun and light hearted film and was easy for us to work, my character will be a young man who's come from the rural side and accomplished a lot but still has a conservative family".

References

2018 television films
Pakistani television films
2018 films